"Nothing but Heartaches" is a 1965 song recorded by The Supremes for the Motown label.

Written and produced by Motown songwriting and producing team Holland–Dozier–Holland, it was notable for breaking the first string of five consecutive number-one pop singles in the United States, peaking at number 11 from August 29, 1965, through September 4, 1965 on the Billboard Hot 100 chart. Despite this, it was the sixth of seven consecutive million-selling singles released by The Supremes between 1964 and 1965.

Overview

Recording
By the spring of 1965, The Supremes had elevated from regional R&B favorites to an internationally successful pop group thanks to a series of five singles which consecutively topped the United States Billboard pop charts: "Where Did Our Love Go", "Baby Love", "Come See About Me", "Stop! In the Name of Love" and "Back in My Arms Again." Known for creating repetitive follow-ups, Motown at this time was relying on a formula to create songs with a similar sound present in records by The Temptations, The Four Tops and Marvin Gaye among other recording acts.

Confident that they had finally found a successful formula, Berry Gordy had Holland–Dozier–Holland created a song similar to several of their earlier hit singles. As expected, "Nothing but Heartaches" had a similar sound to "Stop! In the Name of Love" and "Back in My Arms Again." Gordy felt confident that the song would become their sixth consecutive number-one hit.

Reception
The lukewarm response to "Nothing but Heartaches" was not what Gordy had predicted, as it peaked at number eleven on the Billboard Hot 100. The song's more modest top 20 charting prompted Gordy to circulate a memo around the Motown offices:

After canceling the planned subsequent release of "Mother Dear," Holland-Dozier-Holland produced "I Hear a Symphony."

Cash Box described the song as a "rollicking pop-blues heart-throbber about a love struck gal who can’t break away from a fella who is decidedly wrong for her."

Personnel
Lead vocals by Diana Ross
Background vocals by Florence Ballard and Mary Wilson .
Instrumentation by the Funk Brothers
Baritone saxophone by Mike Terry

Charts

Weekly charts

Year-end charts

Certifications

References

External links
 

1965 songs
1965 singles
The Supremes songs
Songs written by Holland–Dozier–Holland
Song recordings produced by Brian Holland
Song recordings produced by Lamont Dozier
Motown singles
Songs about heartache